Kittredge Cherry (born 1957 in Iowa) is an American author and a priest of Metropolitan Community Church.

Biography
Cherry studied journalism and art history at the University of Iowa. After graduation, she worked as a newspaper journalist and studied in Japan on a Rotary International Journalism Scholarship.

She later studied Christian theology at Pacific School of Religion in Berkeley, California. She was ordained by Metropolitan Community Church (MCC), an international denomination that ministers primarily in the lesbian, gay, bisexual and transgender (LGBT) community. She worked at MCC San Francisco, and then moved to Los Angeles to serve as MCC's national ecumenical officer. One of her main duties was promoting dialogue on homosexuality at the National Council of Churches (USA) and the World Council of Churches.

As part of her ecumenical work, Cherry organized demonstrations for justice in the church, including Hands Around the God-Box at the New York offices of the National Council of Churches in June 1994. The Washington National Cathedral included one of her prayers in 2021-22 services honoring Matthew Shepard, whose murder led to laws against anti-LGBTQ hate crimes. 

Cherry is the author of seven books, including Art That Dares, a finalist for the Lambda Literary Award for 2007. and the Jesus in Love series of novels.
Her books have been translated into German, Polish, Chinese and Japanese. She lives as an open lesbian with her life partner Audrey in Los Angeles and their papers are held at the University of Iowa's Iowa Women's Archives.

Works
2014: The Passion of Christ: A Gay Vision (Apocryphile Press) 
 2008: Jesus in Love: At the Cross (AndroGyne Press) . 
 2007: Art That Dares: Gay Jesus, Woman Christ and More (AndroGyne Press) .
 2006: Jesus in Love: A Novel (AndroGyne Press)  German translation .
 2006: Hide and Speak: A Coming Out Guide (AndroGyne Press reprint of original 1991 HarperSanFrancisco edition) Harper . AndroGyne . Polish translation . Chinese translation .
 2002: Womansword: What Japanese Words Say About Women (Kodansha International) . Japanese translation . 30th-anniversary edition, 2017, from Stone Bridge Press .
 1995: Equal Rites: Lesbian and Gay Worship, Ceremonies and Celebrations (Westminster John Knox Press) .

References

External links
 Qspirit.net

21st-century American women writers
20th-century American women writers
American lesbian writers
LGBT people from Iowa
Metropolitan Community Church clergy
Living people
1957 births
University of Iowa alumni
Pacific School of Religion alumni
Queer theologians
American Protestant religious leaders
American Japanologists
LGBT Protestant clergy
American women non-fiction writers
21st-century American non-fiction writers
Women orientalists